Stillingia trapezoidea is a species of flowering plant in the family Euphorbiaceae. It was described in 1908. It is native to northeastern Brazil.

References

trapezoidea
Plants described in 1908
Flora of Brazil